Top Chef Canada Season 10 (also known as Top Chef Canada X) is the tenth season of the Canadian reality television series Top Chef Canada and was first broadcast on Food Network. The new season was first announced by Food Network Canada on August 17, 2022.The season was filmed in Toronto, Ontario and also included an international travel destination for the first time in the competition's history, when they travelled to the Cayman Islands for the finale and penultimate episode.

The season features special challenges and score system in celebration of the show's tenth season. Many challenges were based on previously used "classic" Top Chef Canada events including the traditional "Restaurant Wars" competition, as well as familiar Quickfire Challenge components. A new addition to the tenth season included the "X" point system, which saw chefs who underperformed in challenges receiving Xs against their name, and would compete in sudden death challenges to stay alive in the competition should they receive three demerit Xs throughout the competition. Once a chef is eliminated from the sudden death challenge, the twist ended.

Season 10 featured Eden Grinshpan again as host, and kept all of its mainstay judges, including Head Judge Mark McEwan, along with resident judges Chris Nuttall-Smith, Mijune Pak and Janet Zuccarini, who rotated through judging elimination challenges, with at least one resident judge present per episode, but at times featured two or all resident judges on some given episodes. David Zilber, culinary and fermentation expert was a new addition to the cast as a resident judge, but only judged for the first three episodes of the competition, due to familial obligations.

Top Chef Canada: Season 10 premiered on September 26, 2022, and concluded on November 14, 2022. In the season finale, Tre Sanderson was declared the winner over runner-up Deseree Lo. For winning the competition, Sanderson was awarded the grand prize of $100,000 (CAD) as well as other cash and tangible prizes.

Contestants

Eleven chefs competed in season 10. Contestants are listed in the alphabetical order of their surnames.

Martine Bauer, 36, Toronto, Ontario
Tawnya Brant, 39, Ohsweken, Ontario
Kimberly "Kim" Conway, 29, Charlottetown, Prince Edward Island
Joachim "Jo" Hayward, 32, Toronto, Ontario
Chris Irving, 40, Whitehorse, Yukon
Camilo Lapointe-Nascimento, 25, Montreal, Quebec
Deseree "Dez" Lo, 45, Vancouver, British Columbia
Vishnav "Vish" Mayekar, 30, Vancouver, British Columbia
Lindsay Porter, 36, Edmonton, Alberta
Trevane "Tre" Sanderson, 27, Toronto, Ontario
Monika Wahba, 32, Toronto, Ontario

Contestant progress 

 (WINNER) The chef won the season and was crowned Top Chef.
 (RUNNER-UP) The chef was a runner-up for the season.
 (WIN) The chef won that episode's Elimination Challenge.
 (HIGH) The chef was selected as one of the top entries in the Elimination Challenge, but did not win.
 (LOW) The chef was selected as one of the bottom entries in the Elimination Challenge, but was not eliminated.
 (OUT) The chef lost that week's Elimination Challenge and was eliminated from the competition.
 (IN) The chef neither won nor lost that week's Elimination Challenge. They also were not up to be eliminated.

Episodes

References 

Canada, Season 10
2022 Canadian television seasons